Shaoshan South railway station is a railway station of the Hangchangkun Passenger Railway located in Hunan, People's Republic of China.

Shaoshan South railway station is well appointed and spacious, and has a regular and fast train service from Changsha South. There are buses at the station that offer inexpensive transfer to Shaoshan and Mao's birthplace village.

Railway stations in Hunan